Sweet Sensation was an eight piece British soul group who had some success in the mid-1970s. They are best known for their 1974 No. 1 UK hit, "Sad Sweet Dreamer".

Career
Formed in Manchester in 1971, the band came to prominence after appearing on the ITV talent show New Faces.  Under the guidance of panellist Tony Hatch, the band signed to Pye Records. The debut single "Snowfire" failed to reach the charts, but the follow-up "Sad Sweet Dreamer" was a UK number one single in October 1974 that also reached No. 14 on the U.S. Billboard Hot 100 the following spring. The follow-up "Purely by Coincidence" reached No. 11 in the UK in January 1975. Both songs were written by David Parton.

Follow-up singles "Hide Away from the Sun", "Mr Cool", "Sweet Regrets" and "Mail Train" all failed to make the charts over the next couple of years. In 1977, the band participated in A Song for Europe in an attempt to represent the United Kingdom at the Eurovision Song Contest. Their song "You're My Sweet Sensation" ended in eighth place. Subsequently, they were then dropped by Pye and disbanded shortly after.  However, they were the forerunners of many similar acts from the Real Thing to Imagination.

The youngest member and lead vocalist, Marcel King, tried to resurrect a solo career in 1985, and with Donald Johnson (A Certain Ratio) and Bernard Sumner (New Order) recorded "Reach for Love" (written by King) for Factory Records without commercial success, followed by "Hollywood Nights" for ZYX. King died of a brain hemorrhage on 5 October 1995 at age 38.

Bass guitarist Barry Johnson later joined Quando Quango and then Aswad.

Founder member Leroy Smith was found dead in his Manchester flat on 15 January 2009. He died from bronchopneumonia at age 56.

Band members

Junior Daye (born 26 June 1950, Kingston, Jamaica) – vocalist
Roy Flowers (born 4 August 1951, Kingston, Jamaica) – drummer
Vincent James (born 12 February 1951, St. Mary's, Jamaica - died 9 May 2019) – vocalist
Barry Johnson (born 20 August 1954, Kingston, Jamaica) – bassist
Marcel King (born Marcel Neville King, 4 January 1957, Manchester – died 5 October 1995) – vocalist
St. Clair L. Palmer (born 4 March 1954, St. Kitts) – vocalist
Gary Shaugnessy (born 25 July 1953, Manchester) – guitarist
Leroy Smith (born 3 September 1952, Kingston, Jamaica – died 15 January 2009) – keyboardist
Delroy Alexander Drummond (born 26 December 1950, Kingston, Jamaica) – vocalist

Recardo "Rikki" Patrick replaced Marcel King in 1975.

Discography

Album
1975: Sad Sweet Dreamer (Pye) (US No. 163)

Singles

Marcel King solo discography
 "Reach for Love" / "Keep on Dancin'" (12", Factory FAC-92, March 1984)
 "Reach for Love (New York remix)" / "Reach for Love (dub)" / "Keep on Dancin'" (12", Factory FAC-92-R, February 1985)
 "Reach for Love (New York remix)" / Reach for Love (dub)" (12", Factory Benelux FBN-43, March 1985)
 "Hollywood Nights" (6:02) / "Hollywood Nights (instrumental)" (3:53) (12", Debut 12-DEBT-1, 1985)

References

External links
[ Sweet Sensation biography] at AllMusic

British rhythm and blues musical groups
British soul musical groups
Musical groups established in 1971
Musical groups disestablished in 1978
Musical groups from Manchester
Pye Records artists